Lucy Atkins is a British author and journalist. Her novels include Magpie Lane. Her books have been published internationally and The Night Visitor (2017) has been optioned for television.

Atkins is the daughter of the lexicographer B. T. S. Atkins and the niece of linguist John McHardy Sinclair. She teaches on the Creative Writing Master's degree at the University of Oxford.  She is a literary critic for The Sunday Times and served as a judge for the 2017 Costa Book Awards She has co-presented features about books on BBC Radio Oxford. She has also written for UK other newspapers and magazines, including The Guardian, The Times, The Sunday Times and The Telegraph.

Selected publications

Fiction
 The Missing One. 2014.
 The Other Child. 2015.
 The Night Visitor. 2017.
 Magpie Lane. 2020.

Non-fiction
 Lucy Atkins. 2010. First-Time Parent: The honest guide to coping brilliantly and staying sane in your baby’s first year. HarperCollins.
 Lucy Atkins and Frances Goodhart. 2011. The Cancer Survivor's Companion: Practical ways to cope with your feelings after cancer.  2011 Hachette UK.
Frances Goodhart and Lucy Atkins. 2013. How to Feel Better: Practical ways to recover well from illness and injury.
 Lucy Atkins. 2009. "The Benefits of Web Workouts." The Daily Telegraph. 1 June 2009.

References

External links
 

1968 births
Living people
writers from Oxford
21st-century British novelists
British women novelists
British journalists
British women journalists
21st-century British women writers